The  were guest houses for foreign ambassadors, traveling monks, and merchants that existed in Japan during the Heian period and earlier. These guest houses existed in Kyoto, Osaka, and Fukuoka. Only the location of the kōrokan in Fukuoka is known with precision today; its ruins were discovered on the grounds of Maizuru Castle Park in 1987. The word  was coined in the Heian period by using the first two characters from the Chinese name 鴻臚寺 for Han dynasty and Qi dynasty temples charged with the responsibility of hosting foreign dignitaries. Though the word is Heian in origin, the kōrokan in Fukuoka and Osaka were already in use in the Asuka period.

Tsukushi Kōrokan (Fukuoka)

The guest house in Fukuoka is called  in Heian sources, after the name of Tsukushi Province, which is part of Fukuoka Prefecture today.

The Buddhist monk Ennin noted in his diary that he passed through the kōrokan in 847 on his way back from a nine year pilgrimage in China, the first reference to the guest house using its Heian name in the historical record. The kōrokan was damaged by a fire in 1047. The last reference in the historical record tells us that the Song merchant Li Jujian (李居簡) copied a sutra there in 1091. By the eleventh century the imperial government no longer held a monopoly on trade with the Asian mainland and the importance of the kōrokan had diminished.

Fukuoka Castle was constructed on the hill to the west of the kōrokan in 1601–1607. During the Edo period historians of the Fukuoka domain thought the kōrokan had been located further east on the other side of the Naka River in Hakata-ku. In the Meiji era the castle fortifications became obsolete and many of them were demolished, though the area continued to serve as a military base. Heijiro Nakayama discovered ancient tiles inside some barracks in 1915 and published research which proposed that the castle ruins were the site of the kōrokan in 1926.

Heiwadai Stadium was built over the site of the kōrokan in 1949. The remains of the kōrokan were discovered in 1987 during a renovation of the stadium. When the stadium was closed in 1997, an archaeological excavation was performed on the site and the oldest stratum was dated to the Asuka period. It was shown that during the Heian period, the kōrokan consisted of a north and south building with stone walls, each surrounding a central courtyard. Yue ware and Islamic glass were discovered on the site. The  stands on the site today.

Naniwa Kōrokan (Osaka)

The Osaka kōrokan is thought to have been located in the Naniwa ward of Osaka. In 561 a delegation from Silla was received there. The Shoku Nihon Kōki says that the guest house was shut down in 844 and its function taken over by the government office of Settsu Province.

Heian-kyo Kōrokan (Kyoto)

When the imperial capital moved to Heian-kyō, modern day Kyoto, in 794, a kōrokan was initially built at the south gate of the city. In the Kōnin era (810-824) it was replaced by an east guest house near Tō-ji Temple and a west guest house near Sai-ji Temple. Emissaries from Balhae were often guests.

The Heian-kyo kōrokan is mentioned in the first chapter of The Tale of Genji. The novel's protagonist, Hikaru Genji, was sent when he was a seven years old to see an expert physiognomist from Goryeo staying at the kōrokan. The physiognomist sees signs that Hikaru is destined to achieve a "sovereign's supreme eminence".

External Links
 Korokan Ruins Museum
 Fukuoka City Guide: Korokan Historical Museum

References 

Archaeological sites in Japan
Historic Sites of Japan